Kelly Brogan is an American author of books on alternative medicine who has promoted conspiracy theories and misinformation about discredited medical hypotheses.

Background and credentials
Brogan graduated from Cornell University Medical College, and has a B.S. in Systems Neuroscience from MIT. She uses the title of "holistic psychiatrist".

Brogan maintained a psychiatry practice in Manhattan from 2009 to 2019, specializing in helping people wean themselves off medication. Peter M. Heimlich stated that she appears not to have maintained certification with the American Board of Psychiatry and Neurology, according to the association's database. She no longer claims to be certified in psychiatry and psychosomatic medicine on her website.

Brogan wrote about health on Gwyneth Paltrow's Goop retail website and was featured on expert panels at several Goop events.

Alternative medicine controversies
Brogan promotes the belief that human diseases are caused not by infectious agents, but rather by psychological factors. She mocks the well-established notion of "little invisible pathogens, you know, that randomly jump around from person to person".

In a similar vein, Brogan attributed the death of AIDS patients not to HIV, but to treatments meant to fight it. Even though the link between HIV and AIDS is clearly established by medical research, she calls it an "assumption". She also defended the unsupported belief that a dysbiosis of intestinal bacteria causes depression; Brogan invites people to stop taking antidepressants and use the techniques and products from her website instead. Through her website, Brogan offers a subscription-only "lifestyle medicine" community space and access to self-improvement training resources.

She also promotes many of the usual erroneous claims against vaccines, notably that the immunity gained from surviving an infectious disease is superior to the one generated by being vaccinated. She also denies polio was eradicated by vaccination.

Despite coffee enemas being long discredited as medical procedures, Brogan promotes them as a treatment for depression.

COVID-19 denialism and conspiracies
An analysis of Twitter and Facebook anti-vaccine content found Brogan to be one of 12 individual and organization accounts producing up to 65% of all anti-vaccine content on the platforms. She has promoted widely disproven conspiracy theories about masks not preventing COVID-19, questioning the existence of a coronavirus causing COVID-19, and conspiracy theories about the COVID-19 pandemic being planned.

Brogan indicated at length that, in her opinion, the virus may not exist. According to her, it's rather the fear of a virus that makes people sick and die. She referred her followers to the pseudoscientific claims of Joseph Mercola and Ryke Geerd Hamer on the topic. Twitter, Facebook, Vimeo and Instagram removed Brogan's videos, as part of their efforts to limit the spread of misinformation during the epidemic, actions Brogan described as "censorship".

Brogan's claims about the cause of diseases, like Hamer's and Mercola's claims, have been debunked by medical experts as dangerous misconceptions.

On that occasion and others prior, she accused the government of being controlled by pro-vaccination "elites" with a sinister agenda. She suggested the pandemic was a ploy by the United States government to force vaccination on people and usher in totalitarian measures. Investigator Benjamin Radford attributes Brogan's theories to a wider phenomenon of self-styled populist health experts inciting people to reject science and embrace their own theories.

Personal life
Brogan lives in Florida, and has two children.

Bibliography
 
  On the New York Times' list of best-selling books.
 (as editor)

See also
 America's Frontline Doctors
 Children's Health Defense
 COVID-19 misinformation
 COVID-19 misinformation by governments
 List of conspiracy theories
 List of unproven methods against COVID-19
 Plandemic
 ScienceUpFirst, a Canadian science communication campaign focusing on the pandemic

References

Year of birth missing (living people)
Living people
American health activists
American anti-vaccination activists
Germ theory denialists
Pseudoscientific diet advocates
Alternative medicine activists
HIV/AIDS denialists
American conspiracy theorists
COVID-19 conspiracy theorists